Kyveli Makri (Greek : Κυβέλη Μακρή) born in Athens, Greece is a ceramic artist. She creates contemporary hand-built ceramics using clay, wood, plexiglass and recycled metals reflecting her attention to form, concept and contemporary hybridity. Her minimalistic use of design and mixed media techniques break the barriers of the present time and filter her creations with a touch of nostalgia, playfulness and artistic dialogues.

Works
Her early work includes block-like ceramic sculptures of houses which incorporate the use of wood and plexiglass. Later she experimented with large pieces such as ceramic sculptures of ships and factories featuring recycled metal pieces . Her later work influenced by the findings from the excavations of ancient Greek pottery is a thematic series interpreted in vessels with formative liquid lines. This series was specifically designed for the Acropolis Museum in Athens .

Her work is displayed in the Acropolis Museum, the Museum of Greek Folk Art, the Benaki Museum and the Centre for the Study of Modern Pottery in Athens, in private collections and various art galleries in Greece. Most recently, Kyveli's work, exhibited at the Centre for the Study of Modern Pottery / The Pottery Museum in Athens, is a figurative interpretation of abstract thinking and spontaneous scribbles. This time, wall-art pieces set on wood and plexiglass deliver her artistic message via a ceramic-sculptural and graphic-mixed medium.

Gallery 

Wall Art

References

External links 
Official Site
The Acropolis Museum
Benaki Museum
Museum of Greek Folk Art
The Santorini Biennale of Arts 2012
Centre for the Study of the Modern Pottery
The American School of Classical Studies at Athens
ArtSculptor

Living people
Greek designers
Year of birth missing (living people)
Artists from Athens